Tyne Dock is a Tyne and Wear Metro station, serving South Tyneside Hospital and the suburb of Tyne Dock, South Tyneside in Tyne and Wear, England. It joined the network on 24 March 1984, following the opening of the fifth phase of the network, between Heworth and South Shields.

History
The station was opened as Jarrow Dock on 1 August 1856, by the Stanhope and Tyne Railway. It was later resited and renamed Tyne Dock on 1 January 1861.

The resited station was situated to the east of the divergence of the Brandling Junction Railway and the Stanhope and Tyne Railway route via Chichester. The current Tyne and Wear Metro station is built to the east of the divergence, but on the former Stanhope and Tyne Railway route.

The route via High Shields was closed in June 1981, with the Tyne and Wear Metro line to South Shields following the former route of the Stanhope and Tyne Railway. 

The station was refurbished in 2018, at a cost of £350,000. The refurbishment project involved the installation of white vitreous enamel panels, new seating and lighting, and improved security and accessibility, as well as resurfaced platforms. The station was also painted in the new black and white corporate colour scheme.

Facilities 
Step-free access is available at all stations across the Tyne and Wear Metro network, with ramps providing step-free access to both platforms at Tyne Dock. The station is equipped with ticket machines, waiting shelter, seating, next train information displays, timetable posters, and an emergency help point on both platforms. Ticket machines are able to accept payment with credit and debit card (including contactless payment), notes and coins. The station is also fitted with smartcard validators, which feature at all stations across the network.

There is a free car park available at the station, with 34 spaces. There is also the provision for cycle parking, with two cycle pods available for use.

Services 
, the station is served by up to five trains per hour on weekdays and Saturday, and up to four trains per hour during the evening and on Sunday.

Rolling stock used: Class 599 Metrocar

References

External links
 
 Timetable and station information for Tyne Dock

Metro stations in South Shields
1984 establishments in England
Railway stations in Great Britain opened in 1984
Tyne and Wear Metro Yellow line stations
Transport in Tyne and Wear
